John Christopher Schwab (April 1, 1865 in New York City — January 12, 1916 in New Haven, Connecticut) was a librarian and a historian of political economy. 

He was the son of Gustav Schwab, of the firm of Oelrichs & Company, and was named for his great-grandfather, a privy counsellor of Stuttgart, Germany. His paternal grandparents were Gustav Schwab, a German poet of note, and Sophie (Gmelin) Schwab. His mother was Catherine Elizabeth, daughter of Laurence Henry and Henrietta Margaretta (Meier) Von Post. Through her, he was descended from Heinrich Melchior Mühlenberg, the chief founder of the Lutheran Church in America.

He was fitted for Yale University under private tutors and at Gibbons' and Beach's School in New York City. He received several prizes in English and Latin composition, High Oration appointments, and was a member of Phi Beta Kappa in college. As a Sophomore, he sang on his Class Glee Club, and the next year he was a member of the Second Glee Club. He was an editor of the Courant in his senior year.

He remained at Yale for a year of post-graduate study in political economy after taking the degree of BA, in 1886, and during this period was also an instructor in German at the Hopkins Grammar School. In July, 1887, he went to Europe, and after spending the summer in travel, entered the University of Berlin. His studies for the degree of Doctor of Philosophy were completed at the University of Göttingen in 1889, and he then returned to the United States and spent some time in historical research in the libraries of New York City. He had received an M.A. in course at Yale in 1888. In the fall of 1890, he took up his work as lecturer in political economy at the University, being made an instructor in that department in the following year. He was promoted to an assistant professorship in 1893, and to a full professorship five years afterwards.

In 1905, after seven years of service in that capacity, Professor Schwab was chosen University librarian, and the remainder of his life was devoted to the upbuilding of the Library. A member of the University Council since his appointment as librarian, he had served for some years on the Council's Committee on Publications, in connection with the work of the Yale University Press. In 1901, he supervised the arrangements for the Yale Bicentennial as chairman of the committee in charge of the celebration. He was a frequent contributor to historical journals and magazines, and at one time was editor of the Yale Review.

The Finances of the Confederate States of America, published by Professor Schwab in 1901, is considered a valuable addition in the field of economic history. He was elected Secretary of the Yale Class of 1886 in 1905, and held that office until his death. To the work of civic betterment in New Haven, professor Schwab gave much of his attention, and at the time of his death he was serving as secretary and treasurer of the social settlement known as Lowell House. He was also president of the Model Housing Association of New Haven. He was on the board of trustees of the New Haven Public Library and a member of St. Paul's Protestant Episcopal Church, of whose Sunday school he was at one time superintendent, and for several years served in Company F, Second Regiment, Connecticut National Guard. He was a trustee of Mount Holyoke College, and in 1913 was on the committee which arranged the pageant held in celebration of the seventy-fifth anniversary of its founding. He was a member of the American and British Economic associations, the Connecticut Academy of Arts and Sciences, the American Library Association, and of the Century Club of New York. In 1911, he received from Mühlenberg College the honorary degree of LL.D.

Professor Schwab's death occurred at his home in New Haven, January 12, 1916, after a brief illness from pneumonia. He was buried in Grove Street Cemetery in that city.

On October 5, 1893, he was married in New Haven to Edith Aurelia, daughter of Samuel Sparks Fisher, upon whom Yale conferred an honorary degree in 1851, and Aurelia Safford (Crossette) Fisher. She survives him with their two children: Katharine Fisher, a student at Vassar, and Norman Von Post. He leaves also two brothers and three sisters, one of the latter being the widow of Henry Charles White (B.A 1881, LL.B. 1883, M.L. 1884). Another brother, Laurence Henry, graduated from the College in 1878. Gustav Schwab (B.A. 1902) and Laurence Von Post Schwab (B.A. 1913) are nephews.

External links 

 John Christopher Schwab family papers (MS 434). Manuscripts and Archives, Yale University Library. 

1865 births
1916 deaths
American librarians
Yale University faculty